Pistoia  may refer to:

 Pistoia, city and comune in the Italian region of Tuscany
 16 Motorised Division Pistoia, an infantry division of the Royal Italian Army during World War II
 Pistoia (surname), an Italian surname